The Roman Catholic Diocese of Nicopolis  is a Roman Catholic diocese of the Latin Rite, which includes the whole northern part of Bulgaria. The seat of the episcopal see is in Rousse, although the diocese is named after Nicopolis ad Istrum. The diocese is immediately subject of the Holy See.

The current bishop is Strahil Kavalenov.

History

Originally erected in 1789, the diocese has not experienced any name changes, nor jurisdictional alterations.

Ordinaries

Francesco Maria Ferreri, C.P. (20 September 1805 Appointed – Jan 1814 Died)
Fortunato Maria Ercolani, C.P. (27 May 1815 Appointed – 19 April 1822 Appointed, Bishop of Civita Castellana, Orte e Gallese)
Giuseppe-Maria Molajoni (23 September 1825 Appointed – )
Angelo Parsi (30 July 1847 Appointed – )
Antonius Jozef Pluym C.P. (15 September 1863 Appointed – 1 March 1870 Resigned)
Ignazio Paoli, C.P. (19 August 1870 Appointed – 27 April 1883 Appointed, Archbishop (Personal Title) of Bucuresti)
Ippolito Agosto, C.P. (27 April 1883 Appointed – 1893 Died)
Henri Doulcet, C.P. (7 January 1895 Appointed – 31 March 1913 Resigned)
Leonardo Baumbach, C.P. (1913 Succeeded – 1915 Died)
Damiaan Johannes Theelen, C.P. (21 May 1915 Appointed – 6 August 1946 Died)
Blessed Eugene Bossilkov, C.P. (26 July 1947 Appointed – 11 November 1952 Died)
Vasco Séirécov (22 July 1975 Appointed – 4 January 1977 Died)
Samuel Dzhundrin, A.A. (14 December 1978 Appointed – 28 June 1994 Retired)
Petko Christov, O.F.M. Conv. (18 October 1994 Appointed – 14 September 2020 Died)
Strahil Kavalenov (20 January 2021 Appointed – present)

Sources and external links

Bibliography
 http://www.catholic-hierarchy.org/diocese/dnicp.html

Roman Catholic dioceses in Bulgaria
Ruse, Bulgaria
Religious organizations established in 1789
1789 establishments in the Ottoman Empire